Apizza Scholls is a pizzeria in Portland, Oregon's Sunnyside neighborhood, in the United States. The pizzeria was started in 2005 by Bryan Spangler.

See also
 Pizza in Portland, Oregon

References

External links

 
 

2005 establishments in Oregon
Pizzerias in Portland, Oregon
Restaurants established in 2005
Sunnyside, Portland, Oregon